Kim Gubser (born 17 May 2000) is a Swiss freestyle skier who competes internationally.

He competed in the FIS Freestyle Ski and Snowboarding World Championships 2021, where he won a bronze medal in men's ski big air.

References

External links

2000 births
Living people
Swiss male freestyle skiers
Freestyle skiers at the 2022 Winter Olympics
Olympic freestyle skiers of Switzerland
21st-century Swiss people